Fabio Wibmer (born 30 June 1995 in Kals am Großglockner) is an Austrian cyclist and stuntman, YouTuber who mainly practices street trials as well as downhill mountain biking. He is best known for his online street trials videos which are comparable to those by Danny MacAskill. He is sponsored by energy drink company Red Bull. He won the national downhill mountain biking championships in 2016, as well is a part of SICK!

His YouTube channel, which was created in 2008, currently has over seven million subscribers and 1.3 billion views. His most watched work is Wibmer's law which received over 221 million views, coming up next with Urban Freeride lives with 213 million views and keeps on inspiring audiences to this day.

References

Austrian male cyclists
Living people
1995 births
Mountain bike trials riders
21st-century Austrian people